The Great Western Railway steam locomotive no. 7822 Foxcote Manor is a 4-6-0 Manor Class locomotive, built in 1950 at Swindon Works. It is part of a post-war batch of 10 locomotives, which follows on from 20 earlier locomotives built in 1938.

Working life
Designed with a lighter axle loading than the red-rating of the other GWR mixed-traffic Hall and Grange 4-6-0 classes, the Manor class were ideally suited to the lightweight cross country and coastal routes of the former Cambrian Railways.

Based over its entire working life on the former Cambrian Railways, its first shed allocation was to Oswestry depot and its last to Shrewsbury, with working allocations also to Chester and Machynlleth. It was used to haul both passenger and freight services over former CR lines including the Cambrian Line and the now-closed Ruabon Barmouth Line. It regularly hauled the "Cambrian Coast Express" from Shrewsbury to Aberystwyth, and in 1965 the British Royal Train.

Preservation
Withdrawn in 1965 from Shrewsbury, it was towed to Woodham Brothers scrapyard in Barry, South Wales. It languished there until 1974, when it was initially moved to Oswestry, the then headquarters of the Cambrian Railways Society. In 1978 it was moved to the Llangollen Railway, a restored part of the Ruabon Barmouth Line, where it returned to service in 1988. It then worked until its second withdrawal in 1997, when after a heavy overhaul it returned to service in 1999.

Since its return to work in preservation, the locomotive has since been on loan to: Gloucestershire Warwickshire Railway, Great Central Railway (Nottingham), Keighley and Worth Valley Railway, North Yorkshire Moors Railway, South Devon Railway and the West Somerset Railway. Following a third 10 year overhaul in preservation, 7822 returned to service in early 2016, and throughout 2017 was on hire, firstly to the Kent & East Sussex Railway, and then to the WSR in 2018.

Allocations

References

External links

7822 Foxcote Manor information from Llangollen Railway
Owning society home page

7822
Railway locomotives introduced in 1950
Llangollen Railway
7822
Locomotives saved from Woodham Brothers scrapyard
Standard gauge steam locomotives of Great Britain